Garrard County High School is a high school located in Lancaster, Kentucky, United States.

The  school is no longer at its West Maple Avenue location, as a new facility was built in 2011. The new Garrard County High School is located at 599 Industry Road, Lancaster, Kentucky.

Garrard County is located in Kentucky's 45th district and 12th region and is a AAA school.

References

External links
 

Schools in Garrard County, Kentucky
Public high schools in Kentucky